SS Charles H. Cugle was a Type Z-EC2-S-C5 Liberty ship built by J.A. Jones Construction of Panama City, Florida, launched on 13 August 1945. It was ordered by the War Shipping Administration under Maritime Commission Contract number 3145.

As part of the Army Nuclear Power Program the ship was transferred to the U.S. Army in March 1963, and fitted with a pressurized water reactor, fuelled by used low enriched uranium, designed by Martin Marietta, becoming the world's first floating nuclear power plant, at a cost of $17 million.

Now renamed Sturgis (MH-1A) the reactor began operation on 24 January 1967 at Fort Belvoir, Virginia, generating 10 MWe of electrical power. The reactor barge was then towed to Gatun Lake in the Panama Canal Zone to provide power, owing to a lack of water for the hydroelectric plant. The ship returned to Fort Belvoir in early 1977, and the reactor deactivated and de-fueled. The ship was decontaminated, sealed, and assigned to the James River Reserve Fleet for an expected 50 years of SAFSTOR.

However, 38 years later the Army Corps of Engineers deemed there were low enough levels of radioactivity in the mothballed vessel's contaminated areas for it to be scrapped.  It was scheduled to be towed from Virginia to Galveston in April–May 2015 where subcontractor Malin International Ship Repair and Drydock will begin the 12- to 18-month work of removing the contaminated material and placing it in rail cars to be hauled to a hazardous materials disposal site, after which the remaining portions of the vessel will be cut up and sold for scrap value.

References

External links
armed-guard.com Charles H. Cugle Photo.
usmm.org  American Merchant Marine at War, Liberty Ships built by the United States Maritime Commission in World War II
"Floating Nuclear Power Stations" WordPress, spartansaving.com, 18 October 2011
Ron Carlson, Re: SS Charles H. Cugle blueprints and stuff, USN WW2 Vets, boardhost.com, 30 January 2010.
Ernest F. Imhoff Where have all the Victory ships gone? Professional Mariner, September 2008

1945 ships
Liberty ships
Ships built in Panama City, Florida